Ruwan Chathuranga (born 13 May 1989) is a Sri Lankan cricketer. He made his first-class debut for Moors Sports Club in the 2016–17 Premier League Tournament on 20 January 2017. He made his List A debut for Nuwara Eliya District in the 2016–17 Districts One Day Tournament on 19 March 2017.

References

External links
 

1989 births
Living people
Sri Lankan cricketers
Moors Sports Club cricketers
Nuwara Eliya District cricketers
Cricketers from Colombo